Rodrigo de Osona, also Rodrigo de Osona the Elder, (c.1440–c.1518) was a Spanish Renaissance painter.

Early work
His initial period of training may have taken place in Ferrara, Padua and Venice. He may have also had a stay in Italy. His works include the altarpiece of Calvary church of San Nicolas de Valencia, signed in 1476 and through which they have been able to attribute other works like the Pietà, now in the Museu de Belles Arts de València, and performed between 1485 and 1490.

Son
There has been some confusion between Rodrigo and his son Francisco de Osona. Father and son worked closely together in their workshop in Valencia, therefore works are often attributed to both, although some assumptions are made that Francisco was more open to what was newer styles and forms in Italy. However, while the activity of Rodrigo ended with his death in 1518, Francisco died before him much younger in 1514. The second table of the Epiphany, preserved in London, is signed by "The teacher's son Rodrigo", in which, on the contrary, there seems to have more traditional trend seen in the works of the father.

Legacy
With basic art training, Rodrigo is considered one of the initiators of Renaissance forms in Spanish painting, coming to a full sense of quattrocento italiano. However, the Italian influences are colored by the knowledge and apply their own formulas of Flemish painting, such as remote expressiveness of idealization. Aspects of kindness and gentleness cater more devotional type reasons that a streamlined and rigorous view of reality. However, his paintings show a concern for the natural and architectural setting of the scenes and superb mastery of oil painting. The work of the  father and son artist team, along with Paolo de San Leocadio, form the basis for Spanish classicism in painting.

References
 Tramoyeres Blasco, Luis, "The Valencian Quattrocento, Osona Maestro Rodrigo and his son of the same name," Spanish Culture, No. 9 (February 1908), p. 139-156, Madrid, 1908.
  TORMO Y MONZÓ, E., "Rodrigo de Osona, father and son, and his school (I)," Spanish Archives of Art and Archaeology, t.8, No.23 (May–August 1932), págs.101-147, Madrid, 1932.
 TORMO Y MONZÓ, E., "Rodrigo de Osona, father and son, and his school (II)", Spanish Archive of Art and Archaeology, t.9, No. 27 (September–December 1933), págs.153-210, Madrid, 1933.
 POST, Chandler R., The Valencian School in the Late Middle Ages and Early Renaissance (A History of Spanish Painting, tI-II), Cambridge (Massachusetts), 1933 (new edition, New York, 1970).
 ANGLE Iniguez, D., Painting XVI century (Ars Hispaniae, t.XV), Madrid, 1971.
 Camon Aznar, J., The Spanish sixteenth-century painting, (Summa Artis, y.XXIV), Madrid, 1970.
 COMPANY, Ximo, La dels Osona painting: A cruïlla d'hispanismes, flamenquismes i italianismes, 2 vols, Lleida, 1991 (in Catalan).
 PEREZ SANCHEZ, AE, restored Art. Barnaba of Modena: Polyptych of the Virgin of the Milk and St. Lucia Cathedral of Murcia. Rodrigo de Osona: Altarpiece of Calvary, St. Nicholas Church, Valencia, Museo del Prado, Madrid, 1993.
 The món dels Osona, ca 1460-ca. 1540, Valencia, Museo San Pio Exhibition January 24 to April 3, Valencia, 1994.

1440 births
1518 deaths
15th-century Spanish painters
Spanish male painters
16th-century Spanish painters
Spanish Renaissance painters
Painters from the Valencian Community